Raymond (Ray) Lindsay Ethington (born in 1929) is an American paleontologist. He works in the Geology department at the University of Missouri in Columbia, Missouri

He was one of the Chief Panderers of the Pander Society, an informal organisation founded in 1967 for the promotion of the study of conodont palaeontology.

In  1983, with John E. Repetski, he described the conodont genus Rossodus

Awards 
In 2007, he received the Raymond C. Moore Medal awarded by the Society for Sedimentary Geology to persons who have made significant contributions in the field which have promoted the science of stratigraphy by research in paleontology and evolution and the use of fossils for interpretations of paleoecology.

References

External links 
 Raymond L. Ethington at University of Missouri website (retrieved 22 June 2016)

American paleontologists
Conodont specialists
1929 births
People from Columbia, Missouri
University of Missouri faculty
Living people
Scientists from Missouri